Harutaeographa ferrosticta is a moth of the family Noctuidae. It is found in the Himalaya, Pakistan and northern India (Jammu and Kashmir).

References

Moths described in 1894
Orthosiini